Algoma is a placename given to many different places throughout the United States and Canada.  Examples include Algoma District, Ontario, Algoma, Oregon, Algoma, Wisconsin, and Algoma Township, Michigan.  Algoma also lends its name to companies such as Algoma Steel and Algoma Central Railway.

Word origin 

The origin of the word Algoma is not entirely clear; the following are definitions culled from several different sources
 The word Algoma was invented as a placename by Henry Schoolcraft.  Goma comes from the Algonquian suffix -gamaa for "lake", while Schoolcraft took the al prefix from the word Algonquian. Henry Schoolcraft's original text, supports the idea that he invented this word: 
 Another definition for the word states that Algoma actually comes from A'Goma (Potawatomi Egema; Ojibwe Agimaa) for "snow shoe". Source: Rev. E. P. Wheeler; A. Skinner in Milwaukee Public Museum Bulletin. r.6 p. 399
 Yet another definition from the Algoma, Wisconsin Chamber of Commerce claims that Algoma is an Indian word meaning "park of flowers".  Several web sites that provide meanings for the names of children and pets state that Algoma means "valley of flowers".
 The history of the town of Algoma, Mississippi contains a reference to Algoma as a Chickasaw word meaning "God abides" given as the name to the Algoma community by a Presbyterian preacher named Savage.

Variations 

The word Algona is frequently seen, substituting an n for an m.  Various sources cite this as a corruption of Henry Schoolcraft's original word Algoma.  Alcona itself is a placename used in the United States and Canada.

References

External links 
 Personal Memoirs of a Residence of Thirty Years With the Indian Tribes on the American Frontiers:  With Brief Notices of Passing Events, Facts, and Opinions, A.D. 1812 to A.D. 1842 by Henry Schoolcraft
 A History of the Place Names of the North Western Line
 Wisconsin History: Origin of the Algoma Placename
 Algoma, WI Chamber of Commerce:  History of Algoma
 Female Native American Names
 Town of Algoma, Mississippi:  Source of "God Abides" definition

Place name etymologies
History of Michigan
History of Minnesota
Algonquian languages
American toponymy
Henry Schoolcraft neologisms